The Zeb Ward Building is a historic commercial building located at 1001–1003 West Markham Street in Little Rock, Arkansas. It is a two-story masonry structure, with cast iron storefront surrounds and otherwise brick construction. The building has vernacular commercial Italianate style, with narrow windows at the upper level set in segmented-arch and round-arch openings with brick headers. Its front facade is topped by a stepped parapet. It was built in 1881 by Zeb Ward, and was probably built by prison labor, with its bricks fabricated in the prison yard. Zeb Ward was at the time of its construction the lessee and operator of the Arkansas State Penitentiary.

The building was listed on the National Register of Historic Places in 1978.

See also
National Register of Historic Places listings in Little Rock, Arkansas

References

Commercial buildings on the National Register of Historic Places in Arkansas
Italianate architecture in Arkansas
Buildings and structures in Little Rock, Arkansas
1881 establishments in Arkansas
Commercial buildings completed in 1881